Residence on Earth is book of poetry by Chilean poet Pablo Neruda. Residence on Earth came out in three volumes, in 1933, 1935, and 1947. Neruda wrote the book over a span of two decades, from 1925 until 1945.

The first volume of Residence on Earth was published by Nascimento on 16 February 1933 in an edition of 100 copies. In a letter to his friend and fellow writer Héctor Eandi, Neruda wrote 'Residencia en la tierra is being printed at this very moment in a luxury edition of just 100 copies, by Nascimento. It will be a stupendous edition. You can count on one copy, the only I'll be able to send to Argentina. It will cost 50 Chilean dollars and I don't think that it will be on sale in Buenos Aires.'

Collections in Residence on Earth:

Series I (1925–1931)
Dream Horse
Savor
Ars Poetica
Burial in the East
Gentleman Alone
Ritual of My Legs
Nocturnal Collection
Series II (1931–1935)
Walking Around
Ode with a Lament
Alberto Rojas Jiménez Comes Flying
There's No Forgetting: Sonata
Series III (1935–1945)
From: The Woes and the Furies
A Few Things Explained
How Spain Was

References

1933 poetry books
1935 poetry books
1947 poetry books
Chilean poetry collections
Pablo Neruda